Lance Bradley Wickman (born November 11, 1940) is an American lawyer and former religious leader who serves as general counsel of the Church of Jesus Christ of Latter-day Saints (LDS Church). Wickman has been an LDS Church general authority since 1994 and was given emeritus status in 2010.

Early life and education
Wickman was born in Seattle, Washington to Alton C. Wickman and Irene Carlson. He was raised in New Jersey and Glendale, California. Wickman graduated from the University of California, Berkeley, in 1964 with a bachelor's degree in political science. In 1966, Wickman, a U.S. Army Ranger, was sent to fight in South Vietnam as a platoon leader in the United States Army and on a second tour of duty as a military advisor to the Army of the Republic of Vietnam. During the war he was awarded the Bronze Star, the Purple Heart, the Valorous Unit Award and the Combat Infantryman Badge.

After his return from South Vietnam, Wickman graduated from Stanford Law School in 1972. In 1986, Wickman was elected to the board of directors of Rancho Bernardo Savings Bank. Wickman has been awarded the Silver Beaver and Silver Buffalo by the Boy Scouts of America.

Legal career
After law school, Wickman entered private practice at the law firm Latham & Watkins. He was a founding partner of the firm's San Diego Office. He was involved in business, real estate, and construction law, and argued cases before both the Supreme Court of California and the Ninth Circuit US Court of Appeals. He retired from the firm at the end of 1995.

LDS Church service
From 1961 to 1963, Wickman was a LDS missionary in the church's Central British Mission. Prior to his call as a general authority, Wickman was a bishop, stake president, and regional representative in the LDS Church. He became a member of the Second Quorum of the Seventy in 1994. In the late 1990s, Wickman worked with Dallin H. Oaks on an article, aimed at an international audience of government figures, on the functioning of the church's missionary program and why its operation is central to religious freedom for church members.

In 2000, Wickman was transferred to the First Quorum of the Seventy. In 2006, Wickman was part of an interview with Oaks regarding homosexuality and the LDS Church. In June 2008, Wickman issued a plea to the media to make clear the distinction between the LDS Church and the Fundamentalist Church of Jesus Christ of Latter-Day Saints.

On October 2, 2010, at the LDS Church's semi-annual General Conference, Wickman was released from the First Quorum of the Seventy and designated an emeritus general authority. In 2013, Wickman spoke on behalf of the LDS Church at the National Religious Freedom Conference in Washington, D.C.

As of 2016, Wickman is the general counsel of the LDS Church and has spoken extensively on religious freedom issues.

Personal life
Wickman married Patricia Farr in 1963 in the Los Angeles California Temple.

See also
 Julie A. Dockstader, "'But as for me and my house, we will serve the Lord,'" Church News, 1994-05-28
 "Elder Lance B. Wickman Of the Seventy," Ensign, May 1994, p. 109
 2008 Deseret News Church Almanac (Salt Lake City, Utah: Deseret Morning News, 2007)

References

External links
 C-SPAN Appearances: Lance B. Wickman
 Grampa Bill's G.A. Pages: Lance B. Wickman
 Same-Gender Attraction: interview with Wickman and Dallin H. Oaks on LDS Church's position on homosexuality
 Letter from Wickman to the media on the need to distinguish clearly between the LDS and FLDS Churches

1940 births
Living people
American general authorities (LDS Church)
United States Army personnel of the Vietnam War
American Mormon missionaries in England
California lawyers
Members of the First Quorum of the Seventy (LDS Church)
Members of the Second Quorum of the Seventy (LDS Church)
Lawyers from Seattle
Stanford Law School alumni
Utah lawyers
Regional representatives of the Twelve
UC Berkeley College of Letters and Science alumni
People from Glendale, California
Latter Day Saints from California
Latter Day Saints from New Jersey
People associated with Latham & Watkins
United States Army soldiers